Arthur Dewey Struble (June 28, 1894 – May 1, 1983) was a United States admiral who served in World War II and the Korean War.

Biography
 
Struble was born in Portland, Oregon. Following graduation from high school in Portland, he entered the United States Naval Academy in 1911 and was commissioned as an ensign in June 1915. Over the next six years, he served in two cruisers, a supply ship and three destroyers. In 1921–23, Struble was an instructor at the Naval Academy, then served in the battleship California (BB-44) until 1925, when he was assigned to the Battle Fleet staff. From 1927 until 1940, he served twice in Navy Department billets, twice on seagoing flag staffs, in New York (BB-34) and Portland (CA-33), and at the 12th Naval District. In 1940-41, he was Executive Officer of Arizona (BB-39). Captain Struble next commanded the light cruiser Trenton (CL-11) in the Pacific.

Leaving Trenton in May 1942, Struble had duty in the Office of the Chief of Naval Operations until late 1943, when he became Chief of Staff to Rear Admiral Alan G. Kirk, who was responsible for U.S. Navy participation in the Normandy Invasion of June 1944. Rear Admiral Struble was assigned to command a Seventh Fleet amphibious group in August 1944, and participated in the invasion of Leyte the following October. Over the next several months, he commanded or participated in landing operations at Ormoc Bay, Mindoro, Luzon and elsewhere in the Philippines. In September 1945, following the end of the Pacific war, Struble commanded the Pacific Fleet's mine force as it began the long process of clearing mines from the former combat zone. 

He commanded the Amphibious Force, Pacific Fleet, during 1946–48. Promoted to vice admiral in April 1948, Struble served for two years as Deputy Chief of Naval Operations. 

In May 1950, he took command of the Seventh Fleet, leading that force through the difficult first year of the Korean War, including the landings at Inchon and Wonsan. For a year, beginning in March 1951, Vice Admiral Struble was Commander, First Fleet, then served briefly with the Joint Chiefs of Staff before being assigned successively to head the U.S. Naval and U.S. Military delegations to the United Nations' Military Staff Committee. From June 1955, he was Commander Eastern Sea Frontier and Commander Atlantic Reserve Fleet. Upon his retirement from active duty in July 1956, he was advanced to the rank of admiral on the basis of his combat awards. 

Admiral Arthur D. Struble died on May 1, 1983.

See also

References

 https://web.archive.org/web/20101105052820/http://www.foia.cia.gov/docs/DOC_0001458639/DOC_0001458639.pdf

External links

External links 

1894 births
1983 deaths
Military personnel from Portland, Oregon
United States Navy admirals
United States Naval Academy alumni
Recipients of the Distinguished Service Cross (United States)
Recipients of the Distinguished Service Medal (US Army)
United States Navy personnel of World War I
United States Navy personnel of the Korean War
United States Navy World War II admirals
Articles containing video clips
Recipients of the Navy Distinguished Service Medal